Hevria is an American Jewish arts and culture website and collective.

History 
Hevria was founded as a group blog in April 2014 by writers Elad Nehorai and Matthue Roth. The site's name is a portmanteau of the Hebrew words "chevra" (group or society) and "briah" (creation). Roth and Nehorai conceived of the project during an email conversation in 2012 with writer Chaya Kurtz, who had gotten attention for an xoJane article entitled "What Women's Media Needs to Know About Chassidic Women"; the three theorized that a full website could give even more insight into Hasidic Jews, and Nehorai subsequently recruited other blogging contacts to participate.

Beginning as a collaborative group blog for personal essays, poetry, and fiction writing, the website evolved into a creative collective hosting communal gatherings, arts workshops, weekend retreats, "creative farbrengens", and other events. Other Hevria projects have included "Hevria Sessions", a series of live studio performances by up-and-coming Jewish musicians such as Levi Robin and Bulletproof Stockings, and Neshamas, a sister site that publishes anonymous stories involving heavier topics such as abuse and mental illness in the religious Jewish community.

On January 2, 2020, Nehorai announced that he would be stepping down as editor of Hevria, citing concerns that the attention he was receiving as an activist was distracting from the site's mission. He clarified that Roth would be taking over the site's leadership and that he would remain involved in a less visible capacity. In January 2022, Nehorai posted an article to his Substack newsletter giving more details about his decision to leave Hevria, in particular citing the backlash to an article he had written defending LGBT rights in the Orthodox community as a culminating moment.

Projects 
In 2016, Nehorai and filmmaker Matthew Bowman began producing through Hevria a five-episode documentary web series on the Israeli community of Bat Ayin, located in the Gush Etzion area.

HevriaCast 
From 2017 to 2019, Nehorai hosted HevriaCast, the website's official podcast, wherein he interviewed artists, writers, and other creatives in the Jewish world. The podcast was recorded at CLAL Studios in New York City, and the standard intro and outro music was the song "Voice Lessons" by Darshan. Many Hevria contributors were guests on the show, as were Hasidic artist Yitzchok Moully, comedian Mendy Pellin, actress and filmmaker Amy Guterson, social media personality Adina Sash, and musicians Dalia Shusterman, Isaiah Rothstein, Bram Presser, Jon Madof, Basya Schechter, and Eprhyme, among others.

Notable contributors 

 Elad Nehorai, blogger and commentator; co-founder and former editor
 Matthue Roth, author and poet; co-founder and current editor
 Lela Casey, columnist and assistant editor of The Wisdom Daily; guest post editor
 Shais Rishon, also known as MaNishtana, African-American Orthodox blogger and author
 Chaya Kurtz, essayist whose XoJane article inspired Hevria
 Andrea Grinberg, cellist and creator of Wrapunzel
 Merri Ukraincik, columnist at New Jersey Jewish News and author of I Live. Send Help., a history of the Joint Distribution Committee
 Peter Himmelman, musician and author
 Rachel Kann, poet and spiritual leader
 Saul Sudin, filmmaker, producer of Punk Jews, husband of artist Elke Reva Sudin
 Yocheved Sidof, founder of Lamplighters Yeshivah
 Salvador Litvak, filmmaker and social media influencer known as Accidental Talmudist
 Shlomo Gaisin, Hasidic musician and lead singer of Zusha
 Sarah Tuttle-Singer, Israeli-American blogger and columnist
 Eric Kaplan, television writer for Futurama, Malcolm in the Middle, and The Big Bang Theory

References 

Blogs about Jews and Judaism
Internet properties established in 2014
2014 establishments in the United States
American blogs